The 2021 Wildwater Canoeing World Championships was the 37th edition of the global wildwater canoeing competition, Wildwater Canoeing World Championships, organised by the International Canoe Federation.

Results

Men

Canoe

Kayak

Women

Canoe

Kayak

Medal table

References

External links
Official website

Wildwater Canoeing World Championships
Wildwater World Championships
ICF
International sports competitions hosted by Slovakia
Sport in Bratislava
Canoeing in Slovakia
ICF